Ctypes, ctype or another variant may refer to:

Science 
 C-type natriuretic peptide
 C-type lectin
 C-type star, or carbon star
 C-type asteroid

Software 
 ctypes, a form of language binding in Python and OCaml that can load C functions from shared libraries or DLLs on-the-fly
 , a header in the ANSI C Standard Library for the C programming language that contains declarations for character classification functions

Vehicles 
 Audi Type C, roadster
 Citroën Type C, roadster
 Jaguar C-Type, racing sports car
 MG C-type, race car
 Auto Union Type C, Grand Prix race car
 Mercedes-Benz C-Class, sedan car
 Renault C-Type engine, straight-4 car engine
 C-type (New York City Subway car)
 Handley Page Type C, monoplane
 FBA Type C, reconnaissance flying boat
 Díaz Type C, fighter plane
 Sopwith Special torpedo seaplane Type C
 Caudron Navy Experimental Type C Trainer, trainer monoplane
 Consolidated Navy Experimental Type C Flying-Boat
 C class blimp or C type blimp
 Type C submarine of the Imperial Japanese Navy
 Type C escort ship of the Imperial Japanese Navy

Other uses 
 Type-C APS film, see APS-C
 Type C print, photographic print
 Type C connector, coaxial RF connector
 Type C videotape
 Type C ration or C-ration

See also 
 Class C (disambiguation)
 C class (disambiguation)
 C (disambiguation)